Always Will Be is the second EP released by indie hip hop artist J-Live, released in 2003 on the label Triple Threat Productions. It is an EP consisting of eight new tracks.  It was released simultaneously as Always Has Been, another EP by J-Live, which is made up of six tracks from early in his career.

Track listing 
"Always Will Be" - (3:09)
"Add-A-Cipher" - (4:33)
"Deal Widit" - (4:18)
"Get Live" - (3:23)
"Car Trouble" - (3:35)
"Walkman Music" - (4:25)
"9000 Miles" - (4:31)
"Skip Proof" - (2:39)

J-Live albums
2003 EPs
Hip hop EPs